They Were Wrong, So We Drowned is the second album by noise rock band Liars, released in 2004.

The album is considered a massive departure from the post-punk-inspired style of their debut They Threw Us All in a Trench and Stuck a Monument on Top, exploring a more freeform, tribal sound. The album takes the form of a very loose concept album concerning witchcraft upon The Brocken (a mountain) during Walpurgis Night, and tales of witch trials in the area around the Harz Mountains in Germany. The recording coincided with the band's relocation from Williamsburg, Brooklyn to the woods of rural New Jersey, which also inspired the initial direction of the album.

The focus upon the Brocken legends came when one of the band members mistakenly entered "Brocken Witch" into a search engine while researching the first song's title (called "Broken Witch" at the time).

A screenshot of the music video for "We Fenced Other Gardens with the Bones of Our Own" resulted on the band's eponymous creepypasta.

The album was included in the book 1001 Albums You Must Hear Before You Die.

Track listing
 "Broken Witch"  – 6:10
 "Steam Rose from the Lifeless Cloak"  – 2:49
 "There's Always Room on the Broom"  – 3:05
 "If You're a Wizard Then Why Do You Wear Glasses?"  – 2:11
 "We Fenced Other Gardens with the Bones of Our Own"  – 5:28
 "They Don't Want Your Corn, They Want Your Kids"  – 2:38
 "Read the Book That Wrote Itself"  – 3:09
 "Hold Hands and It Will Happen Anyway"  – 4:51
 "They Took 14 for the Rest of Our Lives"  – 4:09
 "Flow My Tears, the Spider Said"  – 6:12

References

External links

2004 albums
Concept albums
Mute Records albums
Albums produced by Dave Sitek
Liars (band) albums
Walpurgis Night fiction